Victoria Elizabeth (V. E.) Schwab (born July 7, 1987) is an American writer. She is known for the 2013 novel Vicious, the Shades of Magic series, and The Invisible Life of Addie LaRue, which was nominated for the 2020 Locus Award for Best Fantasy Novel. She publishes children's and young adult fiction books published under the name Victoria Schwab. She is the creator of the supernatural teen drama series First Kill (TV series), based on her short story of the same name originally published in the 2020 anthology Vampires Never Get Old: Tales With Fresh Bite.

Early life and education 
Schwab was born on July 7, 1987 in California and grew up in Nashville, Tennessee. Schwab went to an all-girls Southern preparatory school. She graduated from Washington University in St. Louis with a Bachelor of Fine Arts in 2009. She had originally planned to study Astrophysics, but changed directions after taking art and literature courses.  She completed her first novel (unpublished) in her sophomore year, and sold her debut novel, The Near Witch, to Disney before graduating.

Career

Schwab's debut novel, The Near Witch, was published by Disney in 2011.

The Guardian called Vicious "a brilliant exploration of the superhero mythos, and a riveting revenge thriller". Additionally, it received a starred review from Publishers Weekly, which also named the novel one of its best books of 2013 for Sci-Fi/Fantasy/Horror. The American Library Association's Reference and User Services Association likewise awarded it the top fantasy book in their 2014 Reading List. In late 2013, the rights for a film adaptation of Vicious were bought jointly by Story Mining & Supply Co and Ridley Scott's: Scott Free Productions.

In 2014, Schwab signed a two-book deal with Tor Books, which included A Darker Shade of Magic and its sequel. The former was published in February 2015, and also received a starred review from Publishers Weekly. In 2017, she signed another book deal with Tor for Vengeful, the sequel to Vicious; a new trilogy set called Threads of Power, which takes place in the same world as the Shades of Magic series; and an "homage to Blade Runner" called Black Tabs.

In May 2018, Schwab gave the sixth annual Tolkien Lecture at Pembroke College, Oxford.

In 2020, Schwab joined the panel of Podcast Writing excuses to discuss book themes and other topics.

The Invisible Life of Addie LaRue was published by Tor Books on October 6, 2020. It was heavily praised and nominated for the 2020 Locus Award for Best Fantasy Novel.

Schwab's short story "First Kill" was published in the 2020 anthology Vampires Never Get Old: Tales With Fresh Bite. On October 15, 2020, Netflix gave a series order to the production First Kill (TV series). Schwab served at the creator and an executive producer of the series and as a writer for a number of episodes. The first season of the series premiered on June 10, 2022 on Netflix.

Personal life 
Schwab grew up in Nashville, Tennessee and has lived in St. Louis, Brooklyn, Liverpool, and Edinburgh. She first came out as gay at age 28.

Bibliography

As Victoria Schwab

The Dark Vault series
The Archived (2013)
The Unbound (2014)
"Leave the Window Open" (2015) (short story)
The Returned  (TBA)

Everyday Angel series
New Beginnings (2014)
Second Chances (2014)
Last Wishes (2014)

Monsters of Verity series
This Savage Song (2016)
Our Dark Duet (2017)

Cassidy Blake series
City of Ghosts (2018)
Tunnel of Bones (2019)
Bridge of Souls (2021)

Standalone works
 Spirit Animals: Fall of the Beasts - Broken Ground (2015)
 Because You Love to Hate Me: 13 Tales of Villainy (2017) (contributing writer)
 (Don't) Call Me Crazy (2018) (contributing writer)

As V. E. Schwab

Villains Series 
"Warm Up" (2013) (short story)
Vicious (2013)
Vengeful (2018)
 Victorious (announced)

Villains Graphic Novels 
ExtraOrdinary (2021)

Shades of Magic series
A Darker Shade of Magic (2015)
A Gathering of Shadows (2016)
A Conjuring of Light (2017)

Threads of Power Series (spin off to Shades of Magic) 
 The Fragile Threads of Power (2023)

Shades of Magic Graphic Novels series
Shades of Magic Vol. 1: The Steel Prince (2019)
Shades of Magic Vol. 2: Night of Knives (2019)
Shades of Magic Vol. 3: The Rebel Army (2020)

The Near Witch series

 "The Ash-Born Boy" (2012) (short story)
The Near Witch (2011) (republished in 2019 under V. E. Schwab)

Standalone works
 "First Kill", a short story within the anthology Vampires Never Get Old: Tales With Fresh Bite (2020)
The Invisible Life of Addie LaRue (2020)
 Gallant (2022)
 Black Tabs (announced)

Awards
 2018 Winner Goodreads Choice Awards - Best Science Fiction for Vengeful 
 2022 Winner Goodreads Choice Awards - Best Best Young Adult Fantasy & Science Fiction for Gallant

References

External links
 
 
 

21st-century American women writers
Living people
American LGBT novelists
Women science fiction and fantasy writers
Women writers of young adult literature
American young adult novelists
1987 births
Washington University in St. Louis alumni
LGBT women
LGBT people from Tennessee
American lesbian writers
21st-century American LGBT people